Uriah Heep may refer to:

Uriah Heep (character), a character in the Charles Dickens novel David Copperfield
Uriah Heep (band), a British rock band active since 1969
Uriah Heep Live, a 1973 double live album